Prince Charming is a 1999 Hong Kong romantic comedy film produced, written and directed by Wong Jing and starring Andy Lau as the titular Prince Charming "Wah Dee", which shares the same name as his role in the classic film A Moment of Romance.

Plot
Wah Dee (Andy Lau) is low level punk living in Mongkok with his mother Fei (Deanie Ip) and works as a motorcycle messenger and sells bootlegged VCDs. Wah was recently dumped by his girlfriend. Later he meets Ice Pok (Michelle Reis), a rich heiress from Shanghai, who followed her father on a business trip to Hong Kong where she solely searches for her mother who have divorced with her father during her childhood. Ice's father Po Ting Kwok (Yu Rongguang) calls the police when his daughter goes missing and suspects Wah after sending people to investigate. Unexpectedly, Ice was abducted by kidnappers and Wah bravely rescues her by himself and donates half of his liver for Ice to heal.  Ice returned to Shanghai after rehabilitation and finds herself in love with Wah. On the day of her birthday, her father organises a party for her and introduce a "Prince Charming" to her. The "Prince Charming" turns out to be Wah, who is dressed handsomely in a formal outfit, as opposed to his usual casual clothing and messy hairstyle.

Cast
Andy Lau as Wah Dee
Michelle Reis as Ice Pok
Deanie Ip as Aunt Fei
Suki Kwan as Salad
Nick Cheung as Tart
Yu Rongguang as Pok Ting Kwok
William Duen as Mr. Fat
Fiona Yuen as Margaret
Jimmy Wong as Albert
Lam Sheung Yee as Catholic Priest
Liu Yuen
Pau Hiu Wah
Kong Foo Keung as Ben
Chow Mei Shing as Kidnapper
Cheang Pou-soi as Waiter
Eddie Che as Hotel Security Guard
Vincent Chik as Hotel Security Guard
Aman Chang as Movie director
Cheung Yuk Wah as Organised Crime Bureau officer
Chang Kin Yung as Policeman

Theme song
Boyfriend (男朋友)
Composer: Kevin Lin
Lyricist: Andy Lau, Kevin Lin
Singer: Andy Lau

Box office
The film grossed HK$15,309,865 at the Hong Kong box office during its theatrical run from 1 April to 6 May 1999 in Hong Kong.

See also
Andy Lau filmography
Wong Jing filmography

External links

Prince Charming at Hong Kong Cinemagic

Prince Charming film review at LoveHKFilm.com

1999 films
1999 romantic comedy films
Hong Kong romantic comedy films
1990s Cantonese-language films
China Star Entertainment Group films
Films directed by Wong Jing
Films about kidnapping
Films set in Hong Kong
Films shot in Hong Kong
1990s Hong Kong films